Willingshausen is a municipality in the Schwalm-Eder district in Hesse, Germany.

Geography

Location
The community of Willingshausen lies in the Schwalm area.

Neighbouring communities
Willingshausen borders in the north on the town of Schwalmstadt, in the northeast on the community of Frielendorf, in the east on the town of Neukirchen and the community of Schrecksbach (all in Schwalm-Eder), in the south on the town of Alsfeld and the community of Antrifttal (both in the Vogelsbergkreis), and in the west on the town of Neustadt (Marburg-Biedenkopf).

Constituent communities
Willingshausen consists of the ten centres of Gungelshausen, Leimbach, Loshausen, Merzhausen, Ransbach, Steina, Steinatal, Wasenberg (administrative seat), Willingshausen and Zella.

Politics

Municipal council

Willingshausen's municipal council is made up of 31 councillors.

As of the last municipal elections held on 26 March 2006, the council seats are apportioned thus:

Culture and sightseeing

Willingshäuser Malerkolonie 
The Willingshausen Painters' Colony is Germany's oldest artists' association. It was founded by a man from Livonia named Gerhardt Wilhelm von Reutern after he had been badly wounded in the Battle of the Nations at Leipzig in 1814 while serving as an officer in the Russian army; as a result, he had to have his right arm amputated. He came to convalesce with his brother's inlaws at the Schwertzellsche Haus in Willingshausen, where he met and got to know the lady whom in 1820 he would wed, Charlotte von Schwertzell. He settled down in Willingshausen and began to draw and paint. He procured an honorary stipend from the Russian Imperial Family, which afforded him financial independence.

In 1825 the Kassel painter Ludwig Emil Grimm, Jacob and Wilhelm Grimm's brother, came to Willingshausen to study landscapes. This is said to be the time when the colony was founded. Many painters worked – and still work today – at Willingshausen. The Museum "Malerstübchen" at the Gerhardt-von-Reutern-Haus documents the artists' work.

Regular events
Two music festivals take place each year in the constituent community of Loshausen, the "World Music Festival der Klangfreunde" on the first weekend of August, and "Rock im Park" in July.

Economy and infrastructure

Transport
Federal Highway (Bundesstraße) B 254 (Homberg – Fulda) is about 6 km east of town. The Alsfeld-West interchange on Autobahn A 5 (Kassel – Frankfurt is about 15 km away.

The community belongs to the North Hesse Transport Network.

References

External links
  Willingshausen
 Painters' Colony in Willingshausen

Artist colonies
Schwalm-Eder-Kreis